Lachlan Ricky Brook (born 8 February 2001) is an Australian professional soccer player who plays as a winger for  club Crewe Alexandra, on loan from  club Brentford. He is a product of the Adelaide United youth system and made his professional debut for the club in 2017. Brook has been capped by Australia at youth level.

Club career

Adelaide United
Able to play across the forward line, Brook began his youth career with spells at Gawler Eagles, Para Hills Knights, FFSA NTC, FFA Centre of Excellence, Adelaide Raiders SC and he joined the youth system at A-League club Adelaide United in November 2016. His progression was such that he was included in the first team squad for the Reds' final 2017 AFC Champions League group stage match versus Jiangsu Suning on 9 May 2017. Brook made his professional debut as a substitute for Riley McGree in the dying minutes of the 1–0 defeat.

Brook spent much of the 2017–18, 2018–19 and 2019–20 seasons playing for the Adelaide United youth teams, but he made 9 first team appearances during the period, which included a substitute cameo late in the 4–0 2019 FFA Cup Final victory over Melbourne City. His only senior goal for the club came in a 5–3 A-League win over Perth Glory on 30 July 2020. For his performances during the 2019–20 season, Brook shared the Adelaide United Youth Player of the Year award with Taras Gomulka. Despite having signed a new two-year contract in June 2020, Brook departed the Hindmarsh Stadium in October 2020.

Brentford 
On 5 October 2020, Brook moved to England to join the B team at Championship club Brentford on a three year contract, with the option of a further year, for an undisclosed fee. He played exclusively B team football until January 2022, when he rejoined Adelaide United on loan until the end of the 2021–22 season. He made 19 appearances during the second half of a 2021–22 season which concluded with defeat at the semi-final stage of the 2022 A-League Men Finals.

On 22 July 2022, Brook joined League Two club Crewe Alexandra on a half-season loan, which was later extended until the end of the 2022–23 season. On the opening day of Crewe Alexandra's season, Brook scored what proved to be the winner on his competitive debut in English football, in a 2–1 victory over Rochdale at Spotland. His run in the team was ended by an ankle injury suffered during a 2–2 draw with Northampton Town on 20 August 2022 and he returned to match play one month later.

International career 
Brook has been capped by Australia at youth level. He was a part of the 2019 AFF U18 Youth Championship-winning squad and scored the only goal of the Final versus Malaysia. Brook made his debut for the U23 team as a half time substitute during a 1–1 friendly draw with New Zealand on 6 September 2019. More than two years later, he won his second call-up for two 2022 AFC U23 Asian Cup qualifiers versus Indonesia, both of which he appeared in. In May 2022, Brook was named in the squad for the 2022 AFC U23 Asian Cup finals and started in all but one match of the team's run to a fourth-place finish.

Career statistics

Honours 
Adelaide United

 FFA Cup: 2019

Australia U20
 AFF U19 Youth Championship: 2019

Australia U17
AFF U16 Youth Championship: 2016

Individual

 Adelaide United Youth Player of the Year: 2019–20 (shared)

References

External links 

Lachlan Brook at brentfordfc.com
Lachlan Brook at crewealex.net

2001 births
Living people
Association football forwards
Australian soccer players
Adelaide United FC players
National Premier Leagues players
A-League Men players
Australian expatriate soccer players
Australian expatriate sportspeople in England
Brentford F.C. players
People from Gawler, South Australia
Australia youth international soccer players
Expatriate footballers in England
Association football midfielders
Association football wingers
Crewe Alexandra F.C. players
English Football League players